Jabbarlu may refer to:
 Jabbarlu, Ardabil